Fairfield is a village in the district  of Bromsgrove, Worcestershire, England.  It is in the civil parish of Belbroughton.

Villages in Worcestershire
Bromsgrove